Bert Smith may refer to:

Bert Smith (footballer, born 1892) (1892–1969), English footballer
Bert Smith (footballer, born 1896), Irish footballer
Bert Smith (ice hockey) (1925–2001), British ice hockey player
R. R. R. Smith (born 1954; known as Bert Smith), British classicist, archaeologist, and academic
Stan Kowalski (born Bert Smith, 1926–2017), American wrestler

See also
Bertie Smith, character in Oh! What a Lovely War
Albert Smith (disambiguation)
Herbert Smith (disambiguation)
Hubert Smith (disambiguation)
Robert Smith (disambiguation)